Princess Katharina Friederike of Württemberg (21 February 1783 – 29 November 1835) was Queen consort of Westphalia by marriage to Jérôme Bonaparte, who reigned as King of Westphalia between 1807 and 1813.

Life
Katharina was born in Saint Petersburg, Russian Empire, to the later King Frederick I of Württemberg and Duchess Augusta of Brunswick-Wolfenbüttel. Her mother, who died when Katharina was five years old, was a sister of Caroline of Brunswick and a niece of King George III of the United Kingdom. After the death of Katharina's mother, her father married Charlotte, Princess Royal, eldest daughter of George III and thus a first cousin of his first wife.

In 1803, Württemberg entered into an alliance with France under Emperor Napoleon I, and one of the terms of the treaty was the marriage of Katharina with Jérôme Bonaparte, Napoleon's younger brother. The wedding was held four years later, on 22 August 1807, at the Royal Palace of Fontainebleau in France. 

Upon marriage, Katharina became Queen consort of the Kingdom of Westphalia. Reportedly, Katharina and Jérôme bonded strongly and had a happy marriage, remaining firmly attached to each other. King Jérôme, however, was unfaithful with multiple partners, including a three-year relationship with Diana Rabe von Pappenheim, but Catharina chose to turn a blind eye. 

When the kingdom of Westphalia was dissolved in 1813, she followed Jerome to France. During the war, she and Désirée Clary took refuge with Julie Clary at Mortefontaine, and when the allied troops took Paris, they took refuge in the home of Desirée Clary in the capital. 

After the downfall of the Napoleonic Empire in 1814, her father expected her to separate from Jerome, as Empress Marie Louise had done from Napoleon, but instead she followed him into exile to Trieste in Austrian Italy. 

During the Hundred Days in 1815, she helped Jerome to escape and join Napoleon, and was as a consequence deported to Württemberg, where she was placed under house arrest. After the defeat of Napoleon, she was joined by her spouse in house arrest. 

Katharina and Jerome were eventually released from house arrest and spent their remaining life together in Trieste and Switzerland, under the name of the Princess and Prince of Montfort. In November 1835, Katharina died in Lausanne, Switzerland.

Issue
Jérôme Napoléon Charles Bonaparte (1814–1847), served in the army of his maternal uncle, King William I of Württemberg.
Mathilde Bonaparte (1820–1904), married Anatoly Demidov, Prince of San Donato. She was prominent during and after the Second Empire as a hostess to men of arts and letters.
Napoléon Joseph Charles Paul Bonaparte (1822–1891), was a close advisor to his cousin Napoleon III and, in particular, was seen as a leading advocate of French intervention in Italy and of the Italian nationalists.

Ancestry

References

 Sabine Köttelwesch, Katharina von Westphalen (1783–1835), in: Helmut Burmeister und Veronika Jäger (Hrsg.), König Jérôme und der Reformstaat Westphalen, Hofgeismar 2006, S. 73–94, ISSN 0440-7520

External links

1783 births
1835 deaths
House of Bonaparte
German queens consort
Royalty from Saint Petersburg
Princesses of Württemberg
Duchesses of Württemberg
Daughters of kings